is a 1993 vertically scrolling shooter video game developed by Compile and published in Japan by Tonkin House for the PC Engine Super CD-ROM². Whereas many shooting games of the era take place in a science fiction setting, this game instead mixes heroic fantasy and ancient Greek mythology. The game follows Silphia, a maiden warrior reincarnated as a demigoddess under Zeus after her demise in battle, facing against the forces of Hades.

Its gameplay is similar to previous shooters by Compile, with the player fighting enemies and bosses, while avoiding collision with their projectiles and other obstacles. Directed by Junichi Nagatsuma and produced by Ikuro Urai, the title was the last shooter by Compile until Zanac X Zanac (2001) and had a limited run. It received mixed reception from critics.

Gameplay 

Sylphia is set in a classical Greek setting and stars a Hellenic woman named Silphia whose city is under attack by forces from the underworld. The young maiden warrior is reincarnated as a demigoddess under Zeus after her demise in battle, facing against the forces of Hades. She is given wings much akin to a dragonfly, which allows her to fly through the air. She must then try to free the rest of the Greek world from control of the forces of Hades, facing off against mythological figures including giants, a Minotaur, a griffin, and a golem.

The game is a vertical-scrolling where players control a flying woman (rather than a space ship which is typical of games from this genre). Its gameplay is similar to previous shooters by Compile; The player controls Silphia through eight stages over a constantly scrolling background, populated with an assortment of enemy forces and obstacles, and the scenery never stops moving until a boss is reached, which must be fought to progress further. Stages have a mid-boss, and then an end boss at each stage.  

Silphia has a main weapon that can be powered up by collecting power-up items. There are also four different special weapons based on the four classical elements she can obtain, which affect her shooting method, and these can be upgraded if the same weapon that is currently being used is picked up or by collecting power-ups. Silphia can execute a powerful lightning beam attack as well, but must be charged after being unleashed by collecting crystals. Getting hit by enemy fire or colliding against solid stage obstacles decreases Silphia' health and the game is over once her health is depleted, though the player has the option to continue, but with a penalty of decreasing the Silphia's firepower to her original state.

Development and release 
Sylphia was developed by Compile, which had previously created Seirei Senshi Spriggan and Spriggan Mark 2: Re-Terraform Project for the PC Engine, but their name is never mentioned in the credits despite many of its staff members working on the project. It was directed by Junichi Nagatsuma and produced by Ikuro Urai. Shinichi Nogami served as the game's sole programmer. Kōji "Janus" Teramoto acted as co-graphic artist alongside Aya "Riu" Shimazaki, Hideo Hotta, Neko Koneko, Shōji Mizumoto, Shunsuke Takashima, and Tenji Satō. The soundtrack was scored by Einosuke Nagao, Katsumi Tanaka, Keiji Takeuchi (of Spriggan Mark 2), Satoshi Shimazaki (of Robo Aleste), and Tsuyoshi Matsushima. Other people also collaborated in its development, including Takayuki Hirono serving as game system adviser. 

The game was first unveiled at the Makuhari Messe convention center in a fifty to sixty percent complete state. The title was published in Japan by Tonkin House for the PC Engine Super CD-ROM² on October 22, 1993. The game has since become a rare rare collector's item that commands high prices on the secondary game collecting market alongside other PC Engine shooting games titles such as Ginga Fukei Densetsu Sapphire, Steam Heart's, or Rayxanber II or Rayxanber III. It was the last shooter by Compile until Zanac X Zanac (2001).

Reception 

Sylphia was met with mixed reception from contemporary critics and retrospective commentators. Readers of PC Engine Fan voted to give the game a 18.1 out of 30 score in a 1998 public poll. Famitsus four reviewers noted its "flashy" enemies and stages but labelled it as a "mess" to play. German magazine Video Games highlighted the game alongside Fray in Magical Adventure CD. and Strip Fighter 2 as import games that can be enjoyed with little knowledge of Japanese. They said however, that the game does little new for the genre, but praised the music.

Eurogamers Tom Massey described the game as "....is so easy on defaults you can clear it on a credit with one eye closed and an arm tied behind your back. Certainly fun for a twice over, its difficulty to acquire and above average presentation continues to make it highly sought after." Hardcore Gaming 101s Kurt Kalata highlighted its Greek setting, music, and boss fights. Nevertheless, Kalata opined that "it's a pretty good game, but there's not much else that stands out about it. It lacks the fierce bombast of MUSHA and the weapon variety of Space Megaforce."

Notes

References

External links 

 Sylphia at GameFAQs
 Sylphia at Giant Bomb
 Sylphia at MobyGames

1993 video games
Compile (company) games
Single-player video games
Tonkin House games
TurboGrafx-CD games
Vertically scrolling shooters
Video games developed in Japan
Video games featuring female protagonists